Israel participated in the 1954 Asian Games held in the city of Manila, Philippines from May 1, 1954 to May 9, 1954.

Medals

Athletics

Diving

Shooting

References

Everything About Sports (Israel's Sports Annual), by Dr. Uriel Zimri and Israel Paz, published 1975 (Hebrew)

Nations at the 1954 Asian Games
1954
Asian Games